"Boulevard of Broken Dreams" is a song by American rock band Green Day. The power ballad is the fourth track from their seventh studio album American Idiot (2004). Reprise Records released "Boulevard of Broken Dreams" as the second single from American Idiot on November 29, 2004. The song's lyrics were written by lead singer Billie Joe Armstrong, and the music was composed by the band. Production was handled by Rob Cavallo and Green Day.

The song speaks from the point of view of American Idiots main character, "Jesus of Suburbia", and is a moderate midtempo song characterized by somber and bleak lyrics. This is in contrast to the previous track on the album, "Holiday", which illustrates Jesus of Suburbia's high of being in The City. MTV's Green Day Makes a Video described "Holiday" as a party, and "Boulevard of Broken Dreams" as the subsequent hangover.

The song was ranked number one on Rolling Stones Reader's Choice: Singles of the Decade list in 2009 and number 65 on the 100 Best Songs of the Decade list in the same year. It has sold over 2 million copies in the United States as of 2010. The single peaked at number two on the Billboard Hot 100, making it Green Day's most successful song in the United States. The song was the ninth-highest-selling single of the 2000–2009 decade with worldwide sales exceeding 5 million copies. As of 2021, "Boulevard of Broken Dreams" is the only song to win both the Grammy Award for Record of the Year and MTV Video Music Award for Video of the Year. It remains one of Green Day's signature songs.

Background
"Boulevard of Broken Dreams" was written during a respite from pre-production on what would eventually become the band's seventh album, American Idiot. Hoping to clear his head and develop new ideas for songs, Green Day frontman Billie Joe Armstrong traveled to New York City alone for a few weeks, renting a small loft in the East Village of Manhattan. He spent much of this time taking long walks and participating in jam sessions in the basement of Hi-Fi, a bar in Alphabet City. He began socializing with songwriters Ryan Adams and Jesse Malin.

Armstrong wrote the song about his time in New York City, about "feeling alone" and trying to take power from that fact. Armstrong felt the song fit nicely with the album's storyline, which is about "going away and getting the hell out, while at the same time fighting their own inner demons." The song's concept is from a Gottfried Helnwein painting of James Dean, Humphrey Bogart, Marilyn Monroe and Elvis Presley sitting in an all-night diner. In the 2005 VH1 Storytellers program featuring Green Day, Billie Joe Armstrong stated that the title of the song was "nicked" from the painting of James Dean walking alone.

Composition

"Boulevard of Broken Dreams" is set in common time and composed in the key of F minor, like "Holiday", its prelude. The opening features an electric guitar with tremolo playing the verse progression, which is a i–♭III–♭VII–IV progression (Fm–A♭–E♭–B♭). The song's distinct tremolo effect on the opening guitar was achieved by digitally manipulating the recording in ProTools. It was difficult to produce, as it needed to remain in sync with the song's tempo. Armstrong added tracks of acoustic guitar-playing to augment his electric guitar rhythms and Cool's drumming. Billie Joe's vocals begin, accompanied by acoustic guitar. The bass and drums enter after the first two lines. The pre chorus features a memorable lead guitar melody before seguing into the distorted chorus. The chorus contains a ♭VI–♭III–♭VII–i progression (D♭–A♭–E♭–Fm), ending on a C major vamp. The solo following the second chorus follows the verse progression while the outro follows a heavily distorted i–♭VI–♭VII–♮vi-♭III-♮VII power chord progression (F5–D♭5–E♭5–D5–A♭5–E5).

Oasis controversy
Noel Gallagher of Oasis criticized Green Day in late 2006, saying, "They should have the decency to wait until I am dead [before stealing my songs]. I, at least, pay the people I steal from that courtesy," referencing the fact that "Boulevard of Broken Dreams" uses the same chord progression as Oasis's hit single "Wonderwall". Gallagher's reaction may have partly been due to the emergence of "Boulevard of Broken Songs", a popular mash-up mixed by San Francisco DJ and producer Party Ben in late 2004. The mix consisted of elements from "Boulevard of Broken Dreams", "Wonderwall", Travis' "Writing to Reach You" and Eminem's "Sing for the Moment", which itself has samples from Aerosmith's "Dream On".

Chart performance
"Boulevard of Broken Dreams" was named Record of the Year at the Grammy Awards of 2006. The song's broad appeal was demonstrated by its performance on several Billboard singles charts: it spent 14 weeks at number one on the Mainstream Rock Tracks chart staying there for 38 weeks, 16 weeks at number one on the Modern Rock Tracks chart staying for 32 weeks, 11 weeks at number one on the Adult Top 40 chart staying at 44 weeks, and four weeks at number one on the Mainstream Top 40 staying there for 26 weeks. This was the first song to top the four charts altogether making this song a multi-chart success. It reached number two on the Billboard Hot 100 (the highest a Green Day song has ever charted on the Billboard Hot 100), staying there for five weeks behind 50 Cent's "Candy Shop". This was also the first Green Day song to reach the Adult Contemporary chart, peaking at number 30 and though "Good Riddance (Time of Your Life)" didn't chart on the Adult Contemporary, it did chart on its recurrent chart.

Outside the United States, "Boulevard of Broken Dreams" charted strongly on many international charts. The song debuted and peaked at number five on the UK Singles Chart on the chart dated December 5, 2004, giving the band their third top 10 single in that country. It stayed in the UK top 100 for 29 weeks, becoming their longest-charting single at the time, but "Wake Me Up When September Ends" would log 32 weeks in the UK top 100 nearly a year later; it remains their second-longest stay on the UK chart. In 2021, the British Phonographic Industry awarded the song a Platinum certification for sales and streams exceeding 600,000 units. The single was successful in Ireland, reaching number two in January 2005 on two occasions and totaling 23 weeks in the top 50. It was their highest-peaking single there until "The Saints Are Coming" topped the Irish Singles Chart in 2006. Elsewhere in Europe, the song reached number one in the Czech Republic, number two in Sweden, and the top 10 in Austria, Denmark, and Norway. In Australasia, the song reached number five in both Australia and New Zealand. It stayed on the latter country's chart longer, remaining on the RIANZ chart for 25 weeks compared to 17 weeks on the ARIA Singles Chart. Despite this, the song was overall more popular in Australia, finishing 2005 as the 31st best-selling single and earning a Platinum certification from the ARIA for sales exceeding 70,000 copies.

In response to Hurricane Katrina and the popularity of "Boulevard of Broken Dreams", Green Day donated all of the iTunes proceeds from this song for the year to the American Red Cross for Katrina aid efforts.

Music video
The award-winning music video for "Boulevard of Broken Dreams" was directed by Samuel Bayer. The music videos for "Holiday" and "Boulevard of Broken Dreams" were filmed with a single, continuous storyline—the video for "Boulevard of Broken Dreams" picks up where "Holiday" has left off, with the last few seconds of "Holiday" audible at the start of the "Boulevard of Broken Dreams" video. Both videos were also shot back-to-back. The video depicts the band members after their car has stalled in the desert, and they begin a melancholy walk down a dusty road. Scenes are interspersed with film footage, taken from around Los Angeles, of homeless people and other miserable sights. The video also features performance footage of the band playing the song in an abandoned warehouse.

The video features a 1968 green Mercury Monterey convertible that was modified for filming in the "Holiday" and "Boulevard of Broken Dreams" videos. The car features a hood ornament in the shape of the hand and heart grenade image from the American Idiot album cover, which was also used in the video for "Holiday". But the "iron fist" was actually used in the video for "Walking Contradiction", when the band members meet at a car towards the end of the video. The band's name is also on the front of the hood in silver letters. The band rode this car to the 2005 MTV Video Music Awards ceremony. As shown in an MTV Making the Video special, Bayer used unorthodox techniques to achieve the aged film look of the "Boulevard of Broken Dreams" video, including using rear projection (as opposed to green screen) and physically damaging the negative: scratching the film with razor blades, pouring coffee on it, and smudging cigarettes on it.

The video won six awards at the MTV Video Music Awards in 2005, most notably for Video of the Year. It also won Best Group Video, Best Rock Video, Best Direction, Best Editing, and Best Cinematography.

Track listings

UK limited-edition 7-inch picture disc

Note
 Live tracks were recorded on September 21, 2004, at the Irving Plaza in New York City.

Charts and certifications

Weekly charts

Year-end charts

Certifications

Release history

References

 
 

2000s ballads
2004 singles
2004 songs
American Idiot
Charity singles
Grammy Award for Record of the Year
Green Day songs
MTV Video Music Award for Best Direction
MTV Video of the Year Award
Music videos directed by Samuel Bayer
Number-one singles in the Czech Republic
Reprise Records singles
Rock ballads
Song recordings produced by Rob Cavallo
Songs written by Billie Joe Armstrong
Songs about dreams
Songs about loneliness
Songs involved in plagiarism controversies
Warner Records singles
American hard rock songs